Made In Switzerland is a live video and album release by Gotthard. It was released worldwide in 2006 as a combined DVD and CD package.

The concert was filmed and recorded at the Hallenstadion in Zürich, Switzerland on December 8, 2005 as part of the bands Lipservice tour.

Track listing

DVD
 "All We Are"
 "Dream On"
 "Hush"
 "Mountain Mama"
 "Let It Be"
 "Top Of The World"
 "I Wonder"
 "Said And Done"
 "One Life One Soul"
 "Nothing Left At All"
 "Sister Moon"
 "The Other Side Of Me"
 "Fire Dance"
 "Battle Of Titans"
 "Homerun"
 "Mighty Quinn"
 "In The Name"
 "Heaven"
 "Lift U Up"
 "Anytime Anywhere"
 "Immigrant Song"

Bonus Material
 Making Of Konzert "Hallenstadion Zürich"
 Making Of Videodreh "Anytime Anywhere"
 Video Clips:
 Lift U Up
 Anytime Anywhere
 Dream On
 Foto-Gallery

CD
 "All We Are"
 "Dream On"
 "Hush"
 "Mountain Mama"
 "Let It Be"
 "Top Of The World"
 "I Wonder"
 "Said And Done"
 "One Life One Soul"
 "Nothing Left At All"
 "Sister Moon"
 "Mighty Quinn"
 "In The Name"
 "Heaven"
 "Lift U Up"
 "Anytime Anywhere"
 "Immigrant Song"

Gotthard (band) albums
Live video albums
2006 live albums
2006 video albums